Zdzisław Staniul (born 3 February 1965) is a Polish sailor. He competed at the 1992 Summer Olympics and the 1996 Summer Olympics.

References

External links
 

1965 births
Living people
Polish male sailors (sport)
Olympic sailors of Poland
Sailors at the 1992 Summer Olympics – 470
Sailors at the 1996 Summer Olympics – 470
People from Węgorzewo